Zărneşti may refer to several places in Romania:

Zărnești, a town in Braşov County
Zărnești, a commune in Buzău County
Zărnești, a village in Mălureni Commune, Argeș County
Zărnești, a village in Jorăști Commune, Galați County
Zărnești, a village in Lăpușata Commune, Vâlcea County

and to:

Zîrneşti, a commune in Cahul district, Moldova